Jaume Sobregrau Mitjans (born 4 September 1986 in Barcelona, Catalonia) is a Spanish footballer who plays as a right back.

References

External links

1986 births
Living people
Footballers from Barcelona
Spanish footballers
Association football defenders
Segunda División players
Segunda División B players
Tercera División players
CF Damm players
Cádiz CF B players
Atlético Albacete players
CF Pobla de Mafumet footballers
SD Huesca footballers
FC Barcelona Atlètic players
CD San Roque de Lepe footballers
Lleida Esportiu footballers
CF Badalona players
CF Reus Deportiu players
Real Murcia players
CF Fuenlabrada footballers